Within Our Gates, also known as Deeds that Won Gallipoli, is a 1915 Australian silent film about Australia's fight with the German Empire and the Ottoman Empire during World War I, including the landing at Gaba Tepe during the Gallipoli campaign. The story was partly based on a play The Man Who Stayed at Home.

It is considered a lost film.

Plot
Max Huitzell (Leslie Victor), a German-American clerk in the War Office, is being blackmailed by a German spy (Norman Easty), transmitting information by wireless from his attic. The spy's adopted daughter Freda (Dorothy Cumming) falls in love with Edgar (Cyril Mackay), the son of the War Minister (John Ralston), and exposes her stepfather. Max and Edgar both enlist and meet in the Gallipoli campaign, where Max gives his life to save Edgar.

Cast
Cyril Mackay as Edgar Ferguson
Leslie Victor as Max Huitzell
Frank Harvey as Carl Heine
Norman Estey as Heinrich Henschell
John Ralston as Andrew Ferguson
Dorothy Cummings as Freda Henschell
Raymond Lawrence
Charles Morse
Frank East

Development
This was the first original feature film from the theatrical company J. C. Williamson Ltd. They had become concerned with reports of American films being made from plays which they were producing in Australia, and decided to move into film production themselves.

They bought the studios of Lincoln-Cass Films in Melbourne and hired two of its staff, Maurice Bertel and W. J. Lincoln. After making two play adaptations, Williamson then decided to produce original stories, starting with Within Our Gates.

Although it was the third movie they made, it was the first of their movies to be released.

Production
The cast were drawn from J. C. Williamson Ltd's theatrical stock company, many of whom appeared in a production of the play The Man Who Stayed at Home, on which the script was partly based. The director was English actor Frank Harvey, who moved to Australia in 1914.

W. J. Lincoln later claimed making the film was his idea.

The landing at Gaba Tepe was staged near Obelisk Bay near Sydney. Other location work was shot in Melbourne, and some interiors done at Melbourne's JCW Studio.

Reception
Reviews were very positive and the film was a popular success at the box office.

The Motion Picture News called it "a really good war story, which is exceptional... Frank Harvey... deserves all the credit that can be given him for making such an interesting picture."

References

External links

Within Our Gates at AustLit
Within Our Gates at National Film and Sound Archive

1915 films
Australian black-and-white films
Australian silent feature films
Australian World War I films
Lost Australian films
1915 war films
1915 lost films
Silent war films

ksh:Get-Rich-Quick Wallingford